William M. Williams was a 19th-century Texan politician who served in the Texas House and Senate from 1846 to 1853 and from 1855 to 1857.

Life
Williams was born on March 28, 1809 to currently unknown parents in Pittsylvania, Virginia. He moved to the Republic of Texas on May 2, 1835 at the age of 26. He married Eliza Jane Emberson on September 20, 1839. They had three children together. Eliza died on August 27, 1856. Williams died on September 8, 1859 at the age of 50, leaving their three children without their biological parents.

Politics

Office holdings
Texas Senate, District 1 from February 16, 1846 – December 13, 1847
Texas Senate, District 1 from December 13, 1847 – November 5, 1849
Texas House of Representatives, District 5 from November 5, 1849 – November 3, 1851
Texas Senate, District 2 from November 3, 1851 – November 7, 1853
Texas House of Representatives, District 3 from November 7, 1853 – November 2, 1857

References

1809 births
1859 deaths
19th-century American politicians
Members of the Texas House of Representatives
Texas state senators